Eli and Diadama Beecher House (also known as the Beecher-Quinby-Allen-Lathers House) is a historic home located at 2 Military Road in Beecher Hollow, Saratoga County, New York.

Description 
It was built about 1830, and is a "T"-shaped timber frame dwelling with a -story, front gabled main block with flanking one-story wings and a -story rear wing. It is banked and has late-Federal/early-Greek Revival style detailing. The front room of the basement contains postal boxes reflecting the building's sometime use as the Beecher Hollow Post Office. The building housed a post office between 1880 and 1948. Also on the property is a contributing barn.

It was listed on the National Register of Historic Places on December 22, 2015.

References

Houses on the National Register of Historic Places in New York (state)
Federal architecture in New York (state)
Greek Revival houses in New York (state)
Houses completed in 1830
Houses in Saratoga County, New York
National Register of Historic Places in Saratoga County, New York